Marrakesh-Tensift-El Haouz was formerly one of the sixteen regions of Morocco from 1997 to 2015. It was situated in central Morocco. It covered an area of 31,160 km² and had a population of  3,576,673  (2014 census). The capital is Marrakesh. In 2015, the region annexed Safi and Youssoufia Provinces (both formerly from the Doukkala-Abda Region) to become the Region of Marrakesh-Safi.

Administrative divisions
The region is made up into the following provinces and prefectures :

 The Prefecture of Marrakesh-Medina (now part of the Prefecture of Marrakesh)
 The Prefecture of Marrakesh-Menara (now part of the Prefecture of Marrakesh)
 The Prefecture of Sidi Youssef Ben Ali (now part of the Prefecture of Marrakesh)
 Al Haouz Province
 Chichaoua Province
 El Kelâat Es-Sraghna Province
 Essaouira Province
 Rehamna Province

History
This region contains some of the richest ancient history in North Africa. Notably the Phoenician settlement of Mogador, originally excavated by André Jodin is along the coast at modern day Essaouira.

References

Bibliography
 C.Michael Hogan, Mogador: promontory fort, The Megalithic Portal, ed. Andy Burnham, Nov. 2, 2007 
 Jean-François Troin and Mohamed Berriane (2002) Maroc: régions, pays, territoires, Published by Maisonneuve & Larose, 502 pages  , 

Former regions of Morocco